Sphaeniscus filiolus is a species of tephritid or fruit flies in the genus Sphaeniscus of the family Tephritidae.

Distribution
Europe, Israel, Egypt, Canary Islands, Ethiopia.

References

Tephritinae
Insects described in 1869
Diptera of Europe
Diptera of Africa